A stunt team is a crew of stunt performers that follow the direction of the stunt coordinator to collectively participate and execute an action sequence for film, television series, commercials, theater or live performance.

Notable stunt teams
 Jackie Chan Stunt Team
 Seng Stunt Team

See also
 Stage combat
 Stunt double

Filmmaking occupations
Team